Sam Walsh or Samuel Walsh may refer to:

 Sam Walsh (businessman) (born 1949), Australian businessman
 Sam Walsh (footballer) (born 2000), Australian rules footballer
 Sam Walsh (politician) (1916–2008), leader of the Communist Party of Quebec
 Samuel Walsh (artist) (born 1951), Irish artist
 Samuel P. Walsh, American educator and politician